The following sortable table comprises the 150 most topographically prominent mountain peaks of Canada.

The summit of a mountain or hill may be measured in three principal ways:
The topographic elevation of a summit measures the height of the summit above a geodetic sea level.
The topographic prominence of a summit is a measure of how high the summit rises above its surroundings.
The topographic isolation (or radius of dominance) of a summit measures how far the summit lies from its nearest point of equal elevation.

Mount Logan exceeds  of topographic prominence.  Five peaks of Canada exceed , 11 exceed , 41 exceed , and 143 ultra-prominent summits exceed  of topographic prominence.



Most prominent summits

Of these 150 most prominent summits of Canada, 108 are located in British Columbia, 20 in Yukon, 16 in Nunavut, ten in Alberta, and one in the Northwest Territories.  Three of these summits lie on the British Columbia-Alberta border and two lie on the British Columbia-Yukon border.  Four of these summits lie on the international Yukon-Alaska border and four lie on the international British Columbia-Alaska border.

Gallery

See also

List of mountain peaks of North America
List of mountain peaks of Greenland
List of mountain peaks of Canada
List of the highest major summits of Canada
List of the major 4000-metre summits of Canada
List of the major 3000-metre summits of Canada

List of the ultra-prominent summits of Canada
List of the most isolated major summits of Canada
List of extreme summits of Canada
List of mountain peaks of the Rocky Mountains
List of mountain peaks of the United States
List of mountain peaks of México
List of mountain peaks of Central America
List of mountain peaks of the Caribbean
Canada
Geography of Canada
:Category:Mountains of Canada
commons:Category:Mountains of Canada
Physical geography
Topography
Topographic elevation
Topographic prominence
Topographic isolation

Notes

References

External links

Natural Resources Canada (NRC)
Canadian Geographical Names @ NRC
Bivouac.com
Peakbagger.com
Peaklist.org
Peakware.com
Summitpost.org

Mountains of Canada
Lists of mountains of Canada
Lists of landforms of Canada
Canada, List Of The Most Prominent Summits Of